The Navy Wives Clubs of America (NWCA) is a national non-profit organization of enlisted and officer United States Navy, Marine Corps, and Coast Guard spouses whose purpose, by federal charter, is to support the Constitution of the United States, promote a friendly relationship between spouses of enlisted United States Navy, United States Marine Corps, or United States Coast Guard personnel, or those in the Reserve components of those branches, and to perform charitable activities as provided by the constitution or bylaws of the organization.

History
NWCA was first chartered in 1936 in Long Beach, California, and was granted a federal charter in 1984.. In 2017 members of NWCA voted to allow male spouses of enlisted and officer armed service members and retirees to become regular members. In 2018 members of NWCA voted to rename the organization and to establish a DBA under Navy Wives Clubs of America and to name it Military Families Worldwide, this is currently being conducted. The official motto of the NWCA is: "They also serve, who stay and wait."

Membership
Active membership is open to spouses of enlisted personnel serving in the United States Navy, Marine Corps, Coast Guard, and the active reserve units of these services. Spouses of enlisted personnel who have been honorably discharged, retired or have been transferred to the Fleet Reserve on completion of duty and widows of enlisted personnel in these services are also eligible for membership.

Associate membership is open to Army, Air Force, officer spouses, and those who have the same aims and goals of the organization but may not qualify for Active membership.

Volunteer activities
NWCA Chapters all across the country participate in the annual Wreaths Across America event where thousands of wreaths are laid at veteran's cemeteries in tribute and remembrance.

Scholarships

The NWCA National Scholarship Foundation
Thirty scholarship opportunities for the children of Navy, Coast Guard, and Marine personnel are awarded annually by the NWCA.

Mary Paolozzi Member's Scholarship
This scholarship is only for members of NWCA.

The NMCCG Scholarship
This scholarship is only for SPOUSES (not children) of the enlisted Navy, Marine Corps, and Coast Guard who are continuing their education.

Judith Haupt Member's Child Scholarship
This scholarship is given to a child of an NWCA member who does NOT carry a military ID card usually because he/she has reached the adult age.

Pauline Langkamp Memorial Scholarship
This scholarship is given to a child of an NWCA member who does NOT carry a military ID card usually because he/she has reached the adult age or has married.

References

External links
Navy Wives Clubs of America : hearing before the Subcommittee on Administrative Law and Governmental Relations of the Committee on the Judiciary, House of Representatives, Ninety-eighth Congress, second session on H.R. 2372 ... August 1, 1984.

Non-profit organizations based in the United States
United States Navy support organizations
Patriotic and national organizations chartered by the United States Congress
Women's clubs in the United States
Organizations based in Long Beach, California
Organizations established in 1936
1936 establishments in California
501(c)(3) organizations
History of women in California